Martin Sensmeier (born June 27, 1985) (Tlingit/Koyukon-Athabascan) is an American actor and model. Of Alaska Native and European-American descent, he is known for playing various Native American roles. He starred in the 2016 remake The Magnificent Seven and had a recurring role as "Wanahton" in the HBO television series Westworld (2018). More recently, he has played a physical therapist in the TV series Yellowstone and a Comanche warrior named Sam in the prequel 1883, both directed by Taylor Sheridan.

He is expected to star in the biopic Bright Path: The Jim Thorpe Story, expected to go into production in mid-2021. Sensmeier would be the first indigenous person to play the star athlete, who was Sac and Fox and won two Olympic gold medals in 1912.

Early life 
Sensmeier was born in 1985 in Anchorage, Alaska, to Raymond and Eva Sensmeier, but was raised in Yakutat. His father is German-Tlingit and his mother is Koyukon-Athabascan from Ruby, Alaska, on the Yukon River. Sensmeier identifies with the cultures of his Alaska Native grandmothers, which his parents stressed. Martin’s paternal grandfather, Gilbert Michael Sensmeier, was born in Indiana of German descent.

Career
Sensmeier began his working career as a welder, then worked on an oil rig for Doyon Drilling. He quit to pursue an acting career in Los Angeles. There and in New York, Sensmeier worked as a professional model; he gradually found work as an actor in Los Angeles.

His first feature film was the sci-fi thriller Beyond the Sky. He appeared in a leading role, as one of the "seven", in the 2016 feature film The Magnificent Seven, a remake of an earlier version. Interestingly, the remake also included Luke Grimes, who plays Kayce Dutton in Yellowstone.

In 2017, Sensmeier was cast in the lead role in the biopic The Chickasaw Rancher, portraying Montford Johnson (Chickasaw), a man who built a ranching empire near the Chisholm Trail. That year he also had a role as Chip Hanson in the movie Wind River, and will reprise the role in the upcoming sequel Wind River: The Next Chapter.

Sensmeier joined the cast in the second (2018) season of the HBO television series Westworld, in the recurring role of Wanahton.

In 2020, he took on the role of Chief Eddy in the original English version of the video game Tell Me Why from Dontnod Entertainment. The game is set in Alaska and the character belongs to the indigenous Tlingit people, as does Sensmeier.

More recently, he has played a physical therapist in Season 2 of Taylor Sheridan's Yellowstone, the four-season saga of the Dutton family and their patriarch's determination to keep the ranch intact, and the character of Sam, a Comanche warrior, in 1883, Sheridan's prequel to Yellowstone. 1883 centers on a group of covered-wagon settlers seeking a new life in Oregon after banding together in Texas. It stars Sam Elliot, Tim McGraw, Faith Hill & newcomer Isabel May as Elsa Dutton, the series narrator and love interest of Sam's.

He has been tapped to star in a biopic entitled Bright Path: The Jim Thorpe Story, which is expected to go into production by Pictureworks Entertainment in mid-2021. Thorpe (Sac and Fox) won two gold medals in the 1912 Olympics, played professional football and baseball, and is considered one of the greatest athletes of the 20th century. The screenplay was written by Abraham Taylor, with Alex Nibley and Sterlin Harjo. The major producer is Angelina Jolie.

Personal life

Sensmeier is a member of the Native Wellness Institute, a youth advocacy group. He is proud of his Alaska Native heritage.

In January 2020, he and partner Kahara Hodges announced they were expecting their first child.

Filmography

References

External links

 

1985 births
Living people
21st-century Native Americans
Alaskan Athabaskan people
Koyukon
Male actors from Anchorage, Alaska
Native American male actors
Native American actors
Tlingit people
American people of German descent
Male models from Alaska